"Batman: Broken City" is a DC Comics storyline that appeared in Batman #620–625, written by Brian Azzarello and illustrated by Eduardo Risso.

Storyline
Batman investigates the murder of Elizabeth Lupo, believed to have been killed by Killer Croc. Batman deduces that Lupo's brother Angel hired Croc to murder his sister. While chasing Angel down an alley, it appears the fleeing suspect murdered a father and mother leaving their son an orphan. Infuriated by the similarity of this murder to his own parents murder Batman interrogates various people, such as Margo Farr (Angel Lupo's lover), the Penguin and the Ventriloquist, in mad pursuit of Angel. At last Batman learns that Angel was innocent, Margo Farr hired Croc to murder Elizabeth and the newly orphaned boy murdered his own parents. All this time the Joker has been monitoring Batman's movements.

Following this story in the Batman comic book series are the events of As the Crow Flies.

Collected editions
 Batman: Broken City (144 pages, hardcover, 2004, Titan Books, DC Comics, softcover, 2005, Titan Books, DC Comics)

References

External links

Comics by Brian Azzarello